Gopalan Iyer Ramanathan  was an Indian music composer for Tamil movies. He is also known as Isai Methai (Genius of Music) or Sangeetha Chakravarthy (Emperor of Music) and is considered to be one of the influential Tamil music composers to take Carnatic music to the masses. Notable for his association with M. K. Thyagaraja Bhagavathar. G. Ramanathan also composed for films of Salem Modern Theatres and Coimbatore Central Studios. His career lasted until his death in 1963. During the 1950s G.Ramanathan's music dominated most of the box office hits of the then leading Tamil movie stars Shivaji Ganesan and M. G. Ramachandran.

Early life
G. Ramanathan (GR) was born in Bikshandarkoil, Srirangam, Tamil Nadu, India. GR's biographer Vamanan indicates that his birth year could have been 1910. GR's father was Gopalsamy Iyer who worked as sub-inspector in the Indian Railways. He lost his parents while being young, and was taken care by his elder brother Sundara Bhagawathar. GR could have schooling only until standard 5. He married Jeyalakshmi in 1942 and had two daughters - Sai and Lakshmi. His grandchildren are Ranjan Balachandra and Bhavani Balachandra who are Lakshmi's son and daughter respectively and Prabhu and Uma Shekhar who are Sai's son and daughter.

He joined the Baratha Gana Saba, a drama troupe and played harmonium at the age of 18. Then he joined the V. A. Chellappa Drama company, and sang playback and played harmonium. In 1932, he first played musical instrument for a Tamil film called Galavarishi which was produced in Bombay.

In 1938 M. K. Thyagaraja Bhagavathar produced Sathyaseelan in Bombay and GR became the music director for that film which followed by the Vipranarayana (old). The first film to be produced in Madras with GR as the music director was Bookailash, followed by Parasuraman and Bhoologa Rambai (old). GR was a resident music director for the Modern Theatres since the beginning except a few which were done by K. V. Mahadevan.

He had acted in Aayiram Thalai Vaangi Apoorva Chinthamani (1947) in the role Sanyasi.

Style
GR never had proper training in carnatic music. It was all Kelvi Gnanam (learning by listening). He had a passion and liking towards carnatic music and went all out in composing. GR became the music director when stage dramas were equally popular in the 1940s. He had to balance up between the cinema and the stage dramas.

It was conditional that the cinema songs of those days had to be composed to the basic carnatic tune and it used to be thought that cinema music would never equal the pure form of carnatic music. GR had proved otherwise when he had composed music for the song "Manmatha Leelaiyai Vendrar Undo" in Haridas sung by M. K. Thyagaraja Bhagavathar. He is a staunch believer that only music that had the carnatic base could endure where most of his songs were "semi classic".

He has a liking for the voices of G. N. Balasubramaniam, M. L. Vasanthakumari, Maharajapuram Viswanatha Iyer, and the Hindi film music director Naushad and his favourite singers in his compositions were S. Varalakshmi, P. Susheela and Jikki. Of all the voices, he is a great lover of M. K. Thyagaraja Bhagavathar. GR believes that only MKT could deliver what was expected of any singer. GR was also an excellent singer and had sung in his own compositions in Ponmudi and also under K. V. Mahadevan's composition for Alli Petra Pillai.

He worked with singers like T. M. Soundararajan, A. M. Rajah, K.J. Yesudas, Seerkazhi Govindarajan, Thiruchi Loganathan, Ghantasala, C. S. Jayaraman, V. N. Sundharam, T. A. Mothi, P. B. Sreenivas, P. Leela, T. V. Rathnam, R. Balasaraswathi Devi, A. P. Komala, Radha Jayalakshmi, M. S. Rajeswari, T. S. Bagavathi, K. Jamuna Rani, P. Suseela, A. G. Rathnamala, N. L. Ganasaraswathi, K. Rani, K. V. Janaki, Soolamangalam Jayalakshmi, Soolamangalam Rajalakshmi, S. Janaki and L. R. Eswari. V. T. Rajagopalan, G. Ramanathan's good friend and assistant, sang few songs for him.

The singing actors M. K. Thyagaraja Bhagavathar, P. U. Chinnappa, M. M. Dandapani Desikar, Kothamangalam Cheenu, M. S. Subbulakshmi, D. K. Pattammal, C. Honnappa Bhagavathar, U. R. Jeevarathinam, N. C. Vasanthakokilam, T. R. Mahalingam, T. R. Rajakumari, K. R. Ramasamy, V. Nagayya, P. Bhanumathi, N. S. Krishnan, T. A. Madhuram, T. S. Durairaj and J. P. Chandrababu also sang memorable songs under his compositions.

GR would strive the singers to the excellence. T. M. Soundararajan said that if one could sing to the satisfaction and the tune of GR you could easily sing for the tune of any music director in any part of the world. GR would sing out the songs before recording to guide the singers. His greatest talent was that he was able to compose tunes suiting the storyline as well as the period of production of the films. He produced a film Pudhu Yugam under Sree Saai Gaanaamirudha Pictures in 1954.

GR's last film was Deivathin Deivam by K. S. Gopalakrishnan. He died of a heart attack in the midst of composing for the film Arunagirinathar. Then T. R. Pappa completed it.

Biography

Vamanan had published a biography entitled Sangeetha Chakravarthi G. Ramanathan (2006), which provides details of 85 Tamil movies in which GR had composed music from 1940 to 1969, 12 songs he had sung in Tamil movies and 4 movies in which he had appeared in minor roles.

Filmography

Music director

Playback singer

References

 Tamil Music Director G. Ramanathan’s Man Friday
 G.Ramanathan's 2006 Biography release by Vamannan
 MKT & G.Ramanathan
 The Founding Father of Tamil Film Music in My Movie Minutes

Indian male film actors
Tamil film score composers
Tamil musicians
1963 deaths
Musicians from Tiruchirappalli
Year of birth missing
Indian male film score composers